Gorodishchi is a rural locality (a village) in Kupriyanovskoye Rural Settlement, Gorokhovetsky District, Vladimir Oblast, Russia. The population was 108 as of 2010.

Geography 
Gorodishchi is located near the Klyazma River, 4 km southwest of Gorokhovets (the district's administrative centre) by road. Slukino is the nearest rural locality.

References 

Rural localities in Gorokhovetsky District